Jane Barbara Grimshaw (born 1951) is a Distinguished Professor [emerita] in the Department of Linguistics at Rutgers University-New Brunswick. She is known for her contributions to the areas of syntax, optimality theory, language acquisition, and lexical representation.

Education
Grimshaw received her B.A. in anthropology and linguistics from University College London in 1973, and her Ph.D. in linguistics from the University of Massachusetts Amherst in 1977.

Career
Grimshaw was on the faculty of Linguistics at Brandeis University from 1977 to 1992. There she worked closely with Ray Jackendoff, with whom she was a co-principal investigator on several projects.

In 1992, she joined the faculty of Linguistics at Rutgers. She is a member of the Rutgers Center for Cognitive Science (RuCCS), and was the acting co-director from 2011 to 2012. 

She taught at two Linguistic Society of America Linguistic Summer Institutes: University of California, Santa Cruz (1991) and University of Illinois at Urbana–Champaign (1999). 

She served on the Executive Committee of the Linguistic Society of America from 1996-1998.

Personal life
Grimshaw is married to linguist Alan Prince.

Selected publications

 
 
 
 
 
 
 Selected Papers in Optimality Theory:
 Projection, heads, and optimality (ROA 68)
 The best clitic: Constraint conflict in morphosyntax (ROA 250)
 Optimal clitic positions and the lexicon in romance clitic systems (ROA 374)
 Economy of structure in OT (ROA 434)
 Chains as unfaithful optima (ROA 844.04)
 Location specific constraints in matrix and subordinate clauses (with supplementary materials) (ROA 857, 1201)
 Last resorts and grammaticality (ROA 892.02), in Optimality Theory and Minimalism: A Possible Convergence, Broekhuis, Hans, and Vogel, Ralf, eds.
 Last resorts: A typology of do-support (with supplementary materials) (ROA 1111, 1127)
 Linguistic and cognitive explanation in Optimality Theory, with Bruce Tesar and Alan Prince. in

Awards and honors
 Sloan Post-doctoral Fellowship, Center for Cognitive Science, Massachusetts Institute of Technology (1979–80)
 American Council of Learned Societies Research Fellowship (1982–83)
 Bernstein Faculty Fellowship, Brandeis University (1984–85)
 Fellowship, Center for Advanced Study in the Behavioral Sciences (2000-2001)

References 

Living people
Women linguists
1951 births
Rutgers University faculty
Brandeis University faculty
Alumni of University College London
University of Massachusetts Amherst College of Humanities and Fine Arts alumni